South Korean boy band 2PM has released thirty-three music videos, eight concert tour videos and one music video compilation. 2PM debuted in 2008 with "10 Out of 10." Its music video featured G.NA as a woman who caught the attention of the seven members and had a comedic tone. Their next music video, for "Again & Again," focused more on choreography. In interspersed scenes, the members are seen pursuing a woman even though she is cheating. The group's first music video not to feature Jaebeom following his departure, "Heartbeat," was darker. It had to be re-filmed as Jaebeom originally took part in it.

In 2011, 2PM debuted in Japan with the single "Take Off." The music video for "Hands Up," the title track from their second Korean album, centered on the members partying, contrasting with their previous videos. It was filmed in Singapore. A music video for the group's 2008 song "Only You" was shot and released in 2012 to accompany their album 2PM Member's Selection. The "A.D.T.O.Y." music video was shot entirely in black and white and showed a more mature side of the group. 

In 2014, 2PM won the Mnet Asian Music Award for Best Music Video with "Go Crazy!" The music video for "My House" was originally set to be directed by Han Sa-min, who backed out on short notice, pushing back the release date and forcing the group to find a new director. Naive Creative Production, a video production team, directed the video, which took inspiration from fairytales. The "Promise (I'll Be)" music video, released in September 2016, was the eighth-most watched in America and ninth worldwide on Billboards list of the most viewed K-pop videos for that month.

Music videos

Video albums

DVDs

Filmography

Film

Television drama

Reality shows

Commercials

Cass Beer

Coca-Cola (Korea)

Everland Cabi

Touch Korea

References

External links

 Official Website 
 2PM Official Japan 

Videography
Videographies of South Korean artists